Sky Lake is a census-designated place (CDP) and an unincorporated area in Orange County, Florida, United States. The population was 6,153 at the 2010 census. It is part of the Orlando-Kissimmee, Florida Metropolitan Statistical Area.

Geography
Sky Lake is located at  (28.460949, -81.391672).

According to the United States Census Bureau, the CDP has a total area of 3.3 km (1.3 mi2), of which 3.3 km (1.3 mi2) is land and 0.79% is water.

Demographics

As of the 2000 census, there were 5,651 people, 1,955 households, and 1,468 families residing in the CDP.  The population density was 1,731.6/km (4,483.8/mi2).  There were 2,122 housing units at an average density of 650.2/km (1,683.7/mi2).  The racial makeup of the CDP was 69.99% White, 12.26% African American, 0.34% Native American, 2.27% Asian, 0.74% Pacific Islander, 9.31% from other races, and 5.10% from two or more races. Hispanic or Latino of any race were 34.68% of the population.

There were 1,955 households, out of which 30.7% had children under the age of 18 living with them, 53.8% were married couples living together, 15.4% had a female householder with no husband present, and 24.9% were non-families. 18.4% of all households were made up of individuals, and 8.3% had someone living alone who was 65 years of age or older.  The average household size was 2.89 and the average family size was 3.27.

In the CDP, the population was spread out, with 25.3% under the age of 18, 8.3% from 18 to 24, 28.9% from 25 to 44, 22.6% from 45 to 64, and 14.8% who were 65 years of age or older.  The median age was 37 years. For every 100 females, there were 94.6 males.  For every 100 females age 18 and over, there were 92.1 males.

The median income for a household in the CDP was $36,791, and the median income for a family was $41,505. Males had a median income of $24,902 versus $19,309 for females. The per capita income for the CDP was $17,727.  About 10.4% of families and 12.9% of the population were below the poverty line, including 17.9% of those under age 18 and 13.4% of those age 65 or over.

References

Census-designated places in Orange County, Florida
Greater Orlando
Census-designated places in Florida
Unincorporated communities in Orange County, Florida